DAT politics is a  French electronic band created in 1999. Their energetic live shows explain the cult like enthusiasm that surrounds the French electronic combo as they’ve been touring the world extensively over the years. The two founder members (also known as Tone Rec, Mazza Vision and  Skipp) are also involved in visuals and graphic design which leads them to create their own record covers and videos.
The music of the duo is often classified under the electropop genre and described as catchy, melodic and sometimes experimental. They’ve been influential for a lot of young electronic composers worldwide.

They collaborated and played with famous electronic experimental acts such as Matmos, Mouse On Mars, Dan Deacon, Black Dice, Aphex Twin, Squarepusher, Pan Sonic, Felix Kubin, Kid 606, Robert Lippok…
They played at numerous techno parties and festivals all over the world such as Warp Electrowerk in England, Sonar Night, Baltimore in USA, Dour Festival in Belgium or  Donau Festival in Austria.
They appeared on multiple experimental or dance compilations,  such as Clicks & Cuts alongside  Alva Noto, Pan Sonic, Thomas Brinkmann or iTunes Essentials alongside French Touch 2.0 artists like Mr Oizo, Daft Punk and Kavinsky.
They remixed a bunch of international electronic producers.

Originally a laptop quintet, the band works as a duo since 2009. To these days, they released ten studio albums on numerous international labels:  Tracto Flirt 1999 ( Skipp/Tigerbeat6),  Villiger 2000 ( A-Musik), Sous Hit 2001  (Digital Narcis), Plus Plus 2002, Go Pets Go 2004,  Wow Twist 2006,  Mad Kit 2009 (Chicks On Speed), Blitz Gazer 2012  (Sub Rosa),  Powermoon 2013 (Tigerbeat6), No Void 2015 (Shitkatapult). A new album 'Substage' will be released in 2023 on the American Label Disc Drive.

Discography 
STUDIO ALBUMS
 (1999) Tracto Flirt - Tigerbeat6
 (2000) Villiger - A-musik
 (2001) Sous Hit - Tigerbeat6
 (2002) Plugs Plus - COS Rec
 (2004) Go Pets Go - COS Rec 
 (2006) Wow Twist - COS Rec 
 (2009) Mad Kit - COS Rec 
 (2012) Blitz Gazer - Sub Rosa
 (2013) Powermoon - Tigerbeat6
 (2015) No Void - Shitkatapult 
 (2023) Substage - Disc Drive

EP_ SINGLE
 (1999) Process / DAT Politics _Split Series #9 - Fat Cat Records
 (2000) Pâta Jet - Bottrop Boy
 (2001) Rag Bag - Fällt/Fodder
 (2006) Alphabet Series P -Tomlab
 (2006)  Roll -Ljud Records
 (2007) Are Oui Phony? -Tigerbeat6
 (2011) People R Inside - IDD
 (2018) Cheval Rouge - Hypnic Jerk
 (2019) DAT Politics/ Felix Kubin Split Single -Hypnic Jerk
 (2023) Optic Games - Disc Drive

References

External links 
 
 Official fanpage

French electronic music groups